The X Factor: Ji Qing Chang Xiang (激情唱响) was a Chinese version of the reality talent show The X Factor. It was broadcast on Liaoning Television in 2011 and 2012. The broadcasting rights in China were later purchased by Hunan Television as The X Factor: Zhongguo Zui Qiang Yin in 2013.

The first season debuted on 28 July 2011. Judges were Angie Chai Chih-ping, Aduo and Chen Yufan, and it was hosted by Da Zuo and Shao Wenjie. In the final live show held on 30 September 2011, the winner was Li Shangshang.

Ji Qing Chang Xiang
Chinese reality television series
Chinese music television series
2011 Chinese television series debuts
2012 Chinese television series endings
Television series by Fremantle (company)
Chinese television series based on British television series